Rasmus Thellufsen Pedersen (born 9 January 1997) is a Danish professional footballer who plays as a midfielder for USL Championship club Louisville City.

Club career

AaB
Thellufsen was promoted to the senior team of AaB along with U19 teammates Magnus Christensen, Morten Rokkedal, Sebastian Grønning, Joakim Mæhle and Bardhec Bytyqi during the 2016–17 pre-season. Sports Director of AaB, Allan Gaarde, described Rasmus as a classic creative midfielder with forces in dribbling and creating the unexpected. The 28 of August, Thellufsen debuted in the Danish Superliga as a substitute for an injured Kasper Risgård in the 34th minute against AGF. A week later, at 7 September, he would get his first starting position in the Danish Cup against Nørresundby from the lower divisions.

On 29 August 2019, Hansa Rostock signed Thellufsen on loan until the end of 2019–20 season.

Lyngby
Thellufsen left AaB on 6 September 2020, signing with Lyngby Boldklub. He suffered relegation to the Danish 1st Division with the club on 9 May 2021 after a loss to last placed AC Horsens.

On 25 July 2021, Thellufsen scored his first goal for Lyngby, securing a 2–1 away win over Nykøbing deep into injury time, after having come on as a substitute for Magnus Westergaard in the 81st minute. Mainly utilised as a defensive midfielder, Thellufsen had an impressive streak at the end of the 2021–22 season as a central midfielder with three goals in the final two matchdays. His performances helped Lyngby win promotion to the Superliga.

On 5 January 2023, Thellufsen was sold to USL Championship club Louisville City.

Career statistics

Honours 
AaB

 Danish Cup
 Runner-up: 2019–20

Lyngby

 Danish 1st Division 
 Runner-up (promotion): 2021–22

References

External links
 

1997 births
Living people
Danish men's footballers
Danish expatriate men's footballers
Association football midfielders
People from Frederikshavn Municipality
Denmark youth international footballers
Denmark under-21 international footballers
Sportspeople from the North Jutland Region
AaB Fodbold players
FC Hansa Rostock players
Lyngby Boldklub players
Danish Superliga players
Louisville City FC players
3. Liga players
Danish 1st Division players
Danish expatriate sportspeople in Germany
Danish expatriate sportspeople in the United States
Expatriate soccer players in the United States